Umbra was a collective of young black writers based in Manhattan's Lower East Side that was founded in 1962.

Background
Umbra was one of the first post-civil rights Black literary groups to make an impact as radical in the sense of establishing their own voice distinct from, and sometimes at odds with, the prevailing white literary establishment. The attempt to merge a Black-oriented activist thrust with a primarily artistic orientation produced a classic split in Umbra between those who wanted to be activists and those who thought of themselves as primarily writers, though to some extent all members shared both views. Black writers have always had to face the issue of whether their work was primarily political or aesthetic. Moreover, Umbra itself had evolved out of similar circumstances: in 1960 a Black nationalist literary organization, On Guard for Freedom, had been founded on the Lower East Side by Calvin Hicks. Its members included Nannie and Walter Bowe, Harold Cruse (who was then working on The Crisis of the Negro Intellectual, 1967), Tom Dent, Rosa Guy, Joe Johnson, LeRoi Jones, and Sarah Wright, among others. On Guard was active in a famous protest at the United Nations of the American-sponsored Bay of Pigs Cuban invasion and was active in support of the Congolese liberation leader Patrice Lumumba. From On Guard, Dent, Johnson, and Brenda Walcott and Askia Touré established Umbra.

Umbra Magazine
The Umbra collective produced Umbra Magazine, which grew out of Friday-night workshops, meetings,
and readings on Manhattan's Lower East Side in summer 1962, "and out of the need expressed for it at those meetings". Two issues, edited by Calvin Hernton, David Henderson and Tom Dent, were produced during the group's life-time, including a 'Richard Wright Mnemonicon' in the second issue. After the group split and the workshops themselves ended following the assassinations of Malcolm X and John F. Kennedy, David Henderson took over as editor. A third issue appeared as 'Umbra Anthology: 1967-1968', followed by the fourth issue, 'Umbra Blackworks' in 1970, and 'Umbra Latin / Soul', co-edited by Henderson, Barbara Christian and Victor Hernandez Cruz in 1974.

Major writers
Steve Cannon
Thomas Covington Dent/Tom Dent
Al Haynes
David Henderson
Calvin C. Hernton
Joe Johnson
Norman Pritchard
Lennox Raphael
Ishmael Reed
Archie Shepp, musician-writer
Cecil Taylor, musician-poet
Art Berger
Lorenzo Thomas
James Thompson
Askia M. Touré (Roland Snellings; also a visual artist)
Brenda Walcott
 Raymond R. Patterson
Rashidah Ismaili

Askia Touré, a major shaper of "cultural nationalism," directly influenced LeRoi Jones, along with Umbra writer Charles Patterson and Charles's brother, William Patterson. Touré joined Jones, Steve Young, and others at BART/S (Black Arts Repertory Theatre/School). Umbra is often cited as a predecessor to the Black Arts Movement, and is discussed in books such as Eugene Redmond's Drumvoices, Aldon Nielsen's Black Chant, Kalamu ya Salaam's The Magic of Juju and Lorenzo Thomas's Extraordinary Measures. Many members of Umbra took part in Black Arts and post-Black Arts activity, including Ishmael Reed's Before Columbus Foundation in California, David Henderson's involvement with the Nuyorican Poets Cafe in New York, and Tom Dent's work with The Free Southern Theatre in New Orleans. (Dent also established the long-running magazine Callaloo, alongside Charles Henry Rowell and Jerry Ward).

Further reading
 Fortune, Angela Joy, "Keeping the Communal Tradition of the Umbra Poets: Creating Space for Writing", Black History Bulletin, Vol. 75, No. 1, Spring 2012.
 Grundy, David, A Black Arts Poetry Machine: Amiri Baraka and the Umbra Poets, Bloomsbury Academic, 2019.
 "Umbra and Lower East Side Poetics" in Daniel Kane, All Poets Welcome: The Lower East Side Poetry Scene in the 1960s, University of California Press, 2003, pp. 79–90.
 Oren, Michel, 'A '60s Saga: The Life and Death of Umbra', Freedomways, Volume 24, issue 3, (Third Quarter) 1984, 167-181 (Part 1), and Volume 24, issue 4, (Fourth Quarter) 1984, 237-254 (Part 2). A longer version of the same essay appears in Joseph Weixlmann and Chester J. Fontenot (eds.), Belief Vs. Theory in Black American Literary Criticism, Penkevill Publishing Company, 1986.
 Thomas, Lorenzo, 'The Shadow World: New York's Umbra Workshop & Origins of the Black Arts Movement', Callaloo No. 4 (Oct., 1978), pp. 53-72

References

External links
 Historical Overviews of The Black Arts Movement
 Rone Shavers, "Black Bohemia's Tribal Elder", Black Issues Book Review, Vol. 3 Issue 1, January/February 2001, p. 32.
 'A Black Arts Poetry Machine'

African-American poets
American poets